Sarangesa motozi, also known as the forest elfin or elfin skipper, is a species of butterfly in the family Hesperiidae. It is native to southern and eastern Africa.

Description
The wingspan is 36–38 mm for males and 38–40 mm for females. The upper surface of the wings are variegated brown and grey.

Distribution
This species is found from Cape Town and the eastern side of South Africa, to Zimbabwe, Botswana, Angola, and to Kenya and Ethiopia.

Life cycle

Larvae
The larvae feed on Barleria, Justicia and Peristrophe species, including Peristrophe hensii.

Adults
Adults are on wing year-round, although they are scarcer in the dry season.

References

Butterflies described in 1857
Celaenorrhinini